Carlton Hotel may refer to:

 Carlton Hotels & Suites, a Hotel Chain in the Middle East
 The Carlton Tower Jumeirah, London, United Kingdom
 InterContinental Carlton Cannes Hotel, France
 Carlton Hotel (Atascadero, California)
 Carlton Hotel, Christchurch, New Zealand
 Carlton Hotel (Johannesburg)
 Carlton Hotel, London, a luxury hotel that operated from 1899 to 1940.
 Carlton Tel Aviv, Israel
 The St. Regis Washington, D.C., known for many decades as The Carlton Hotel and the Sheraton-Carlton
 Carlton Hotel, Sydney, 1930s

See also
The Ritz-Carlton Hotel Company
Hotel Carlton